Emmanuel Daniel is an entrepreneur, author and top influencer in the finance industry. Daniel founded The Asian Banker in Singapore in September 1996 as a publisher of research and benchmarking, and events serving the financial services industry. Daniel is chairman of TAB Global Pte Ltd, which runs The Asian Banker, Wealth and Society and other content and community platforms.

His first book, “The Great Transition – the personalization of finance is here", was published in September 2022.  The book’s foreword was written by former congressman Barney Frank, who co-authored the Dodd-Frank Wall Street Reform and Consumer Protection Act in 2010. Frank said, “I commend Emmanuel’s analysis to my successors”. Richard Sandor, widely considered the father of financial futures, and Dick Kovacevich, former chairman of Wells Fargo, also provided their support for the book.

Daniel was listed as one of the top 50 influencers globally by The Fintech Power50 publication in July 2021, and again in 2022. Daniel won the Citibank Excellence in Journalism Award for Asia in February 1999 for his work in determining the impact of the Internet on banking. The Asian Banker Summit, which he launched in 2001, won the Best Financial Conference for Asia Award in 2012 at the Asian Conference Summit and Awards. 

He is the creator of the Excellence in Retail Financial Services programme which benchmarks and ranks retail banks according to operational and service quality since 2000, and is now followed in Asia, Middle East and Africa.

He founded Wealth and Society in 2018, a global programme where wealth is assessed by its relevance to philanthropy, corporate social responsibility or impact on the environment and the sustainability, and well-being of the societies.

Daniel maintains a blog and speaks at international events around the world.

References

External links 
 The Great Transition at World Scientific
 TAB Global
 Emmanuel Daniel - Blog

1962 births
Living people
Singaporean businesspeople
People from Kuala Lumpur
Malaysian people of Indian descent
Tamil businesspeople
Businesspeople of Indian descent